Katherine Dunbabin is an archaeologist specialising in Roman art and Professor Emerita of Classics at McMaster University.

Career
Dunbabin studied at the University of Oxford, and was awarded her doctorate in 1970. Her thesis was titled Studies in the mosaic pavements of Roman North Africa. When Dunbabin started her DPhil there was little English-language research into Roman art. Her first book, The mosaics of Roman North Africa: studies in iconography and patronage with the Clarendon Press, was published in 1978. It was based on her doctoral research. Barry Cunliffe described it as 'a contribution to classical studies of considerable significance, for not only does it give a thorough treatment to a body of material of outstanding beauty and interest, but in doing so it greatly enlivens our understanding of the social, economic and artistic systems which pervade the Roman world.' Her interest in the subject of Roman art continued, and in 1999 she published a book, Mosaics of the Greek and Roman World, with Cambridge University Press. A review in The Telegraph described the book as 'a masterpiece of visual, historical, technical and social analysis'.

While preparing a book on mosaics, Dunbabin began researching Roman dining spaces, looking particularly at how they were decorated. This led to Dunbabin publishing a second book with Cambridge University Press, exploring how art can be used to give insight into social history. Dunbabin was a visiting fellow at All Souls College, Oxford between January and June 2001. In 2004, Dunbabin was awarded a Killam Fellowship so she could dedicate time to researching the role of theatre in Roman society and Roman art. The aim was to produce a book and deliver a series of public lectures on the topic. She retired from McMaster University in 2006.

Dunbabin has been part of the Journal of Roman Archaeology's editorial board since 2009.

Publications

Books

Articles

References

External links

Sitting Down with Katherine Dunbabin via YouTube

Living people
Year of birth missing (living people)
Classical scholars of McMaster University
Alumni of the University of Oxford
British classical scholars
Women classical scholars